Lena Christina Eriksson (born October 8, 1972 in Järfälla, Stockholm) is a former female breaststroke swimmer from Sweden, representing Spårvägens SF. She competed for her native country at the 1996 Summer Olympics in Atlanta, Georgia, where she ended up in ninth place in the Women's 200m Breaststroke.

Clubs
Spårvägens SF

References

1972 births
Living people
Swimmers at the 1996 Summer Olympics
Olympic swimmers of Sweden
Medalists at the FINA World Swimming Championships (25 m)
Swedish female breaststroke swimmers
20th-century Swedish people
21st-century Swedish people